Hoople is a city in Walsh County, North Dakota, United States. The population was 247 at the 2020 census. Hoople, named for early settler Alan Hoople, was founded in 1889. Hoople's nickname is "Tatertown."

Hoople is probably best known outside North Dakota as the location of University of Southern North Dakota at Hoople, the fictional university created by Peter Schickele. (Presumably it is an extension campus of a fictional University of Southern North Dakota, since the real Hoople is located in the northeastern, not southern, part of the state.)

Geography
Hoople is located at  (48.535224, −97.636818).

Demographics

2010 census
As of the census of 2010, there were 242 people, 115 households, and 63 families living in the city. The racial makeup of the city was 93.0% White, 6.6% from other races, and 0.4% from two or more races. Hispanic or Latino of any race were 9.1% of the population.

There were 115 households, of which 25.2% had children under the age of 18 living with them, 43.5% were married couples living together, 6.1% had a female householder with no husband present, 5.2% had a male householder with no wife present, and 45.2% were non-families. 41.7% of all households were made up of individuals, and 18.3% had someone living alone who was 65 years of age or older. The average household size was 2.10 and the average family size was 2.87.

The median age in the city was 44 years. 21.5% of residents were under the age of 18; 8.4% were between the ages of 18 and 24; 20.6% were from 25 to 44; 34.7% were from 45 to 64; and 14.9% were 65 years of age or older. The gender makeup of the city was 51.2% male and 48.8% female.

2000 census
As of the census of 2000, there were 292 people, 133 households, and 79 families living in the city. The population density was 817.0 people per square mile (313.2/km2). There were 148 housing units at an average density of 414.1 per square mile (158.7/km2). The racial makeup of the city was 97.60% White, 0.68% Native American, 0.34% Asian, and 1.37% from two or more races. Hispanic or Latino of any race were 4.45% of the population.

There were 133 households, out of which 27.8% had children under the age of 18 living with them, 45.9% were married couples living together, 9.8% had a female householder with no husband present, and 40.6% were non-families. 39.8% of all households were made up of individuals, and 22.6% had someone living alone who was 65 years of age or older. The average household size was 2.20 and the average family size was 2.96.

In the city, the population was spread out, with 24.3% under the age of 18, 7.9% from 18 to 24, 24.0% from 25 to 44, 25.3% from 45 to 64, and 18.5% who were 65 years of age or older. The median age was 43 years. For every 100 females, there were 82.5 males. For every 100 females age 18 and over, there were 85.7 males.

The median income for a household in the city was $29,250, and the median income for a family was $38,125. Males had a median income of $26,786 versus $21,094 for females. The per capita income for the city was $14,836. About 6.0% of families and 11.8% of the population were below the poverty line, including 14.8% of those under the age of eighteen and 21.7% of those 65 or over.

Notable people
Lynn Frazier, governor of North Dakota and United States Senator
 Murdo George McIver, miner and namesake of McIver's Cabin.

References

External links
 Hoople, North Dakota :community fact survey (1964) from the Digital Horizons website

Cities in North Dakota
Cities in Walsh County, North Dakota
Populated places established in 1890
1890 establishments in North Dakota